Oicha is a city in North Kivu Province, in eastern Democratic Republic of the Congo. and has been built around a mission hospital which has been opened in the year 1935. 

1964 at an intermission medical conference has been held at Oicha Hospital. 

In August 2018 the ebola outbreak in the Kivu province reached the city and vaccinations have been started by health organizations, led by WHO and supported by the MONUSCO mission by the United Nations.

References

Populated places in North Kivu